Barbara Smith Murphy (born 1957) is an American politician who serves as a member of the Vermont House of Representatives from the Franklin district as an independent.

Early life and education

Barbara Smith Murphy was born in Burlington, Vermont, in 1957, to Levi and Sybil Smith. She graduated from Burlington High School in 1975, and from the University of Vermont with a Bachelor of Arts in 1980. She married Michael James Murphy, with whom she had two children before his death in 2003, on June 21, 1980, and moved to Fairfax, Vermont.

Career

Murphy served as a justice of the peace from 1998 to 1999, and on the board of selectmen from 2004 to 2005. She was appointed to the Aviation Advisory Council by Governor Phil Scott. She was elected to the Vermont House of Representatives from the Franklin district as an independent candidate in the 2014 election after defeating Republican nominee Chris Santee and independent candidate Bob Shea. She was reelected in the 2016 and 2018 election against Republican nominee Mary Beerworth. Murphy won without opposition in the 2020 election.

Electoral history

References

Living people
21st-century American politicians
21st-century American women politicians
1957 births
Members of the Vermont House of Representatives
Politicians from Burlington, Vermont
Vermont Independents
Women state legislators in Vermont